Marbles Kids Museum is a nonprofit children's museum located in downtown Raleigh, North Carolina in the Moore Square Historic District.  

Marbles was founded in 2007 as a result of the merger between Exploris, an interactive global learning center, and Playspace, a children's museum aimed at preschool through early elementary age children. Marbles mission is to "..spark imagination, discovery and learning through play."

Exhibits 
Marbles has several permanent, play-based exhibits that align with five core initiatives -  Ready Set Learn, Be Healthy Be Active, Create Innovate, Explore Experiment and Connect.

IMAX 
Marbles has an IMAX theater on its campus that plays first-run Hollywood features and 45-minute documentary movies.

History 
Marbles predecessor Exploris opened in 1999 as a $39.5 million state-of-the-art interactive global learning center. Playspace was an interactive children's museum aimed at preschool through early elementary age children.  The move to the former Exploris space is the third move to a larger location in the museum's history. Playspace was originally located two blocks south of Marbles in City Market. It remained there until the late 1990s, moving to 410 Glenwood Avenue in a former dairy building. The non-profit museum received some funding from Wake County but was largely funded by corporate sponsorships of individual exhibits as well as the $5 per person admission price and memberships. In the summer of 2007, the two museums closed. Playspace moved into Exploris' building, and a new name for the combined museums was chosen. Marbles were selected to reflect the museum's unique two-story stainless steel wall grid inset with over 1.2 million marbles. The name was released to the public on September 29, 2007, the same day the new museum opened to the public.

External links 
 Marbles Kids Museum

References 

Children's museums in North Carolina
IMAX venues
Museums in Raleigh, North Carolina